Jawornik Ruski  is a village in the administrative district of Gmina Bircza, within Przemyśl County, Subcarpathian Voivodeship, in south-eastern Poland.

Ukrainian priest and composer Mykhailo Verbytsky was born in the village.

References

Jawornik Ruski